Eupithecia cunina is a moth in the family Geometridae first described by Herbert Druce in 1893. It is found in Guatemala.

References

Moths described in 1893
cunina
Moths of Central America